The Orlando Jackals were a professional roller hockey team based in Orlando, Florida, United States that played in Roller Hockey International.

History 
The Edmonton Sled Dogs were established in Edmonton, Alberta, Canada, joining Roller Hockey International in 1994. The franchise moved to Orlando, Florida and became the Orlando Rollergators in 1995. The Rollergators were purchased before the start of the 1996 and were renamed the Orlando Jackals.

References 

 
Roller Hockey International teams
Sports clubs established in 1994
Sports clubs disestablished in 1997
Sports teams in Orlando, Florida
1994 establishments in Alberta
1997 disestablishments in Florida